Kandaka of the Sudanese Revolution (also known as Woman in White and Lady Liberty of the Sudanese Revolution) is a photograph of Alaa Salah, a 22-year-old student, chanting during the Sudanese anti-government protests on 8 April 2019. The photograph, taken by activist Lana Haroun using a smartphone, gained world-wide media attention and went viral in April 2019, and was described by several media organisations as iconic, representing women's (Kandakas') participation in the revolution.

Background 

Since December 2018, a series of protests against President Omar al-Bashir took place, demanding economic reforms and the resignation of the president. A state of emergency was declared in February 2019 as a result of the protests, and the days of 6 and 7 April saw the largest protests since the declaration of this state of emergency. In continuing protests, the army was seen protecting protesters from the security forces on 10 April. Eventually the protests led to the military removing al-Bashir from power, installing a transitional council in his place led by Ahmed Awad Ibn Auf, but the demonstrators, including Salah, claimed it was just a change of leadership of the same regime and demanded a civilian transitional council.

The photograph 
As protests continued, on 8 April, Lana Haroun took the image using her smartphone (Huawei Mate 10, back camera, HDR technic) of an initially unnamed woman dressed in a white thoub standing on a car, who spoke to and sang with other women around her during a sit-in near the army headquarters and the presidential palace.  A part of the poem the woman had recited, “The bullet doesn’t kill. What kills is the silence of people”, is a well-known slogan chanted by protestors in January 2018, as well as during earlier protests against the Sudanese government in September 2013.

The image which came to be known as the Kandaka of the Sudanese Revolution (also known as Woman in White and Lady Liberty of the Sudanese Revolution) was widely shared on social media and caught international media attention. The image has been described as symbolic of the crucial role of women in the success of the demonstrations, with some estimates claiming that up to 70 per cent of the protesters had been women. Sudanese women played major political roles in Sudanese and Africa-wide human rights struggles since the 1950s via the Sudanese Women's Union, continued creating organisations such as the No to Oppression against Women Initiative in 2009, and remained politically active during the 2018–2019 Sudanese Revolution.

Impact and significance 
Salah's white robe, a traditional Sudanese thoub, recalled the dress of female Sudanese protesters against previous dictatorships, as well as that of student protesters who were referred to as "Kandakas" after ancient Nubian queens. Her golden earrings are traditional feminine wedding attire. Commentators called the pose "the image of the revolution". Hala Al-Karib, a Sudanese women's rights activist, said: "It is a symbol of an identity of a working woman — a Sudanese woman that's capable of doing anything, but still appreciates her culture."

Similar photographs 

Another well-known image of these protests is a photograph by Japanese photographer Yasuyoshi Chiba of Agence France-Presse, showing a young man in Khartoum reciting protest poetry, while demonstrators chant slogans calling for civilian rule. The photo was selected as World Press Photo of the Year 2020.

Soudan 2019, année zéro, a book about the Sudanese revolution, was published in 2022, and acted as a visual documents of different stages and social backgrounds of the revolution up to the Khartoum massacre on 3 June 2019.

Alaa Salah 

Alaa Salah, born 9 March 1997, was 22 at the time when the photo was taken and a student studying engineering and architecture at Sudan International University in Khartoum. She gained world-wide media attention due to the photo and was dubbed "the Sudanese revolution icon". Salah was invited to several interviews and she and Martin Roux co-wrote the book The song of revolt - The Sudanese uprising told by its icon, which details Salah's personal account of the Sudanese revolution.

As a member of MANSAM, one of the main Sudanese women's networks that signed the 1 January 2019 Forces of Freedom and Change declaration, Salah was later invited to give a speech at the 29 October 2019 meeting of the United Nations Security Council, insisting on equal representation of women in the Sudanese transitionary institutions.

See also 

 2019–2022 Sudanese protests
 Taking a Stand in Baton Rouge
 Women in Sudan
 Hawa Al-Tagtaga

References 

2010s photographs
Photographs of protests
2019 in art
2019 works
Color photographs
Photography in Sudan
Sudanese Revolution
Protests in Sudan
2019 in Sudan
2019 protests
April 2019 events in Africa
2018–2022 Arab protests
People notable for being the subject of a specific photograph